Kenneth Hachikian (born April 18, 1966) is an Armenian American economist and public activist who has served as the chairman of the Armenian National Committee of America since 2000.

He received his BA in Economics and MBA from Harvard University. As a financial and operating executive, he worked for 9 years with The Boston Consulting Group, advising Fortune 1000 companies on corporate, financial and operational strategies. From 1991 to 1994, Hachikian served as President of LINC Scientific Leasing, Inc., and, from 1983 to 1989, as President and CEO of Wellesley Medical Management, Inc. He is the Board Chairman of the Cambridge Heart, Inc.

Hachikian is a proponent of the Dashnak ideology, and has been an active member of both the Young Presidents' Organization and the World Presidents' Organization.

References

External links 
 Profile
 Chairman Will Present 2003 ANCA Agenda During Visit to Southern California Armenian Community
 Cambridge Heart Announces Changes to Board of Directors; Kenneth Hachikian Named Board Chairman
 Hachikian in Armeniapedia

American people of Armenian descent
Boston Consulting Group people
Harvard Business School alumni
Living people
1966 births